Enrique Fernández Viola, commonly referred to as Enrique Fernández, (10 June 1912 – 6 October 1985) was a Uruguayan football player and manager who played for Nacional, Talleres (RE), Independiente, FC Barcelona, Uruguay and the Catalan XI. As a manager, he won two Uruguayan championships with Nacional and La Liga titles with both FC Barcelona and Real Madrid. Along with Radomir Antic, he is one of only two coaches to have taken charge of both FC Barcelona and Real Madrid and he is the only coach to have won La Liga titles with both. He was born in Montevideo, Uruguay.

Career

Playing career
In January 1935, while playing for Nacional, Fernández helped Uruguay win the South American Championship. His team mates at both Nacional and Uruguay included Héctor Castro. He subsequently joined FC Barcelona and under coaches Franz Platko and Patrick O'Connell helped them win the Campionat de Catalunya twice and reach the final of the Copa de España. His team mates while playing for FC Barcelona included Joan Josep Nogués, Josep Escolà and Domènec Balmanya. Fernández and Balmanya made their La Liga debuts for Barça together on 10 November 1935 in a 1–0 defeat to RCD Español. He played 17 games for FC Barcelona in La Liga and scored 8 goals. Fernández scored a hat-trick against CA Osasuna in a 5–0 win on 29 March 1936 and then 2 against Athletic Bilbao on 4 April 1936. He played his final La Liga game on 19 April 1936 in a 2–2 draw against Hércules CF.

While at FC Barcelona, Fernández also played three times for the Catalan XI. On 19 January 1936 at the Les Corts, he played in a testimonial for Josep Samitier against SK Sidenice of Czechoslovakia. Other players in the Catalan XI that day included Sagibarba and Balmanya. His playing career at FC Barcelona was ended by the Spanish Civil War. When the war started, he was in Montevideo and the club advised him to stay there.

Coaching career
After retiring as a player due to a serious knee injury, Fernández began coaching and in 1946 he guided Nacional to a Uruguayan championship. In 1947 he returned to La Liga to coach CF Barcelona. With a squad including Velasco, Ramallets and Estanislao Basora, he helped the club win two La Liga titles in 1948 and 1949. During his third season the club also won the first ever Copa Latina. Despite this, CF Barcelona could only finish fifth in La Liga and he was replaced the following season by Fernando Daucik.

Fernández rejoined Nacional and guided them to a second Uruguayan championship in 1950. He was appointed coach at Real Madrid for the 1953–54 season and with a team that included Alfredo Di Stéfano, Francisco Gento, Miguel Muñoz, Luis Molowny and Héctor Rial he guided the club to their first La Liga title since 1933. He managed Real for 10 games at the start of the 1954–55 season but was then replaced by José Villalonga.

Fernández also managed Real Betis for 10 games during the 1959–60 season. In July 1961 he also coached Uruguay in two World Cup qualifying games against Bolivia

Honours

Player

Nacional
Primera División: 2
 1933, 1934.

Uruguay
South American Championship: 1
 1935

FC Barcelona
Copa de España
 Runners-Up:  1936
Campionat de Catalunya: 1
 1934–35, 1935–36

Manager

Nacional
Primera División: 2
 1946, 1950.

FC Barcelona
La Liga: 2
1947-48, 1948–49
Latin Cup: 1
1949

Real Madrid
La Liga: 1
1953–54

Colo-Colo
Primera División: 1
1956

References

 Barça: A People's Passion (1998), Jimmy Burns.

External links
 Enrique Fernandez  at www.fcbarcelona.com
La Liga player stats
Uruguay manager at Rsssf
Titles with  Nacional

1912 births
1985 deaths
Association football forwards
Uruguayan footballers
Uruguayan football managers
Uruguayan expatriate football managers
Footballers from Montevideo
Uruguayan Primera División players
Club Nacional de Football players
La Liga players
FC Barcelona players
Talleres de Remedios de Escalada footballers
Catalonia international guest footballers
Rampla Juniors managers
Club Nacional de Football managers
La Liga managers
FC Barcelona managers
Real Madrid CF managers
Real Betis managers
Club de Gimnasia y Esgrima La Plata managers
Uruguay national football team managers
Club Atlético River Plate managers
Expatriate football managers in Chile
Copa América-winning players
Uruguay international footballers